This is a list of Rhodes Scholars, covering notable people who have received a Rhodes Scholarship to the University of Oxford since its 1902 founding, sorted by the year the scholarship started and student surname. All names are verified using the Rhodes Scholar Database. This is not an exhaustive list of all Rhode Scholars.

Rhodes Scholars

References

External links
Rhodes Scholar Database
Complete list of numbers Rhodes Scholars from the United States by undergraduate institution

Lists of people associated with the University of Oxford